The 2012 DEKALB Superspiel was held from November 22 to 25 at the Morris Curling Club in Morris, Manitoba as part of the 2012–13 World Curling Tour. The event was held in a triple knockout format. The purse for the men's event was CAD$30,000, of which the winner, William Lyburn, received CAD$10,000, while the purse for the women's event was CAD$24,000, of which the winner, Darcy Robertson, received CAD$8,000. In the men's final, Lyburn defeated Alexander Attinger of Switzerland with a score of 8–1 in four ends, while in the women's final, Robertson defeated her sister, defending champion Barb Spencer, with a score of 6–4 in an extra end.

Men

Teams
The teams are listed as follows:

Knockout results
The draw is listed as follows:

A event

B event

C event

Playoffs
The playoffs draw is listed as follows:

Women

Teams
The teams are listed as follows:

Knockout results
The teams are listed as follows:

A event

B event

C event

Playoffs
The playoffs draw is listed as follows:

References

External links

2012 in curling